The Bushranger is a 1928 American silent Western film directed by Chester Withey and written by George C. Hull, Paul Perez, and Madeleine Ruthven. The film stars Tim McCoy, Ena Gregory, Russell Simpson, Arthur Lubin and Ed Brady.

The film was released on November 17, 1928, by Metro-Goldwyn-Mayer.

Plot
A gentleman is arrested for duelling and sentenced to Van Dieman's Land. He escapes and becomes a bushranger.

Cast 
 Tim McCoy as Edward
 Ena Gregory as Lucy
 Russell Simpson as Sir Eric
 Arthur Lubin as Arthur
 Ed Brady as Black Murphy
 Frank Baker as Blair
 Dale Austen as Dale
 Richard Neill as Col. Cavendish 
 Rosemary Cooper as Lady Cavendish

Production
The story was written by Madeleine Ruthven. It was made at the time there was a ban on such films being made in some Australian states. The film was reportedly made in response to criticism of too many Westerns being set in America. Frank Baker, brother of Snowy Baker had a role. Dale Austen was a former Miss New Zealand. This was her only Hollywood film.

References

External links 
 
 The Bushranger at BFI

1928 films
1928 Western (genre) films
American black-and-white films
Bushranger films
Films directed by Chester Withey
Films set in colonial Australia
Metro-Goldwyn-Mayer films
Silent American Western (genre) films
1920s American films
Silent American drama films